Sainik School Goalpara, Assam, India, was established on 12 November 1964, under the Sainik Schools Society, New Delhi under the Ministry of Defence (India). The idea of Sainik schools were presented by the then Defence Minister V.K.Menon in 1961. The school was initially established in the town of Goalpara which is a district headquarter. Subsequently, the school was shifted to its present location at Rajapara Village in Mornai in Goalpara District. Initially 18 Sainik schools were founded.

Sainik School Goalpara celebrated its Golden Jubilee on 12 Nov 2014. It was a year-long celebration, celebrated with great gusto with the involvement of its Old Boys Association (OBA).

The school is located in the north-eastern part of India. Sainik school Goalpara is extended in almost . In this north eastern region of India, there are two more Sainik Schools, one at Imphal, Manipur and the other one at Punglwa in Nagaland. The school is situated 18 km from Goalpara town en route capital Guwahati. The nearest police station is Mornoi and railway station is Goalpara. It is a fully residential school having classes from standard 6th to 12th. Besides the school there is a kindergarten school.

Admission to the school is done for two standards - 6th and 9th. The average strength of each class is 90. The aim of the school is to prepare students for the National Defence Academy exam. Till date more than 200 students have joined NDA and around 500 joined the armed forces through other exams like CDS.

House system
There are eight houses for accommodation. These are divided into three groups- sub-junior, junior, senior. Class VI and VII are sub-juniors. Class VIII and IX are juniors. Class X to XII is seniors. 2 Sub Junior, 3 Junior and 3 Senior Houses.

Sub Junior Houses
 Abhimanyu House is named after Arjun's son Abhimanyu, accommodating Class VI and VII.
 Bhaskar House is named after the mighty sun and accommodates Class VI and VII students.

Junior Houses
 Anirudhha House is named after Lord Krishna's Grandson Anirudha and it accommodates VIII and IX students.
 Eklavya House is named after a young prince of the Nishadha and accommodates class VIII and IX boys.  
 Chilarai House  is named after a General of Nara Narayan who was known for his swiftness and his birthday is celebrated as Chilarai Diwas in Assam. It previously was a senior house but in 2018 it made as a junior house. It accommodates class VIII and IX boys.

Senior Houses
 Udaygiri House is named after an imaginary hill and accommodates class X and XII boys.  
 Lohit House is named after the mighty Brahmaputra which is the lifeline of Assam and accommodates class X and XII boys.  
 Lachit House is named after a great Ahom General and accommodates class X and XII boys.
 Udaygiri House has a tradition of winning cross country race for more than 37 years. They believe in the words of Vivekananda, "Arise awake and stop not till the goal is reached."
 Lachit House has the tradition of winning Drill Competition for more than ten years and being a cock house for more than eight years.
 Lohit has the tradition of winning obstacles race from last two years which was a tradition of Chilarai House for many years.

Besides these eight houses there is a mess and auditorium. The school building is in two parts- the Main building and the Science Block. The main block is a 3-story building having classes for class VI to X. All offices of the school are situated in this block. Science block has classrooms for class XI-XII. The block has science laboratories.

House Days

House Days are the major events for cadets of Sainik School. House Days are celebrated because their house was inaugurated. House Days are the most awaited activity throughout the year. On house day we have a big feast which is organised by the cadets. On the Feast, every teacher of the school is invited. The Houses on House Days look different, The houses are painted and lighted by the cadets only. On House Day we have certain programmes like a cultural Show followed by some games and many more. House Days of different houses:-

 Udaygiri House on 5 September 
 Lohit House on 5 September 
 Lachit House on 13 November 
 Chilarai House on 13 November 
 Anniruddha House on 13 August 
 Eklavya House on 11 November

Structure
Sainik Schools have three officers from the defence forces. They are Principal, Headmaster and Registrar.
 The Principal is the supreme authority of the school, appointed by the Ministry of Defence. The duration of the principal's tenure is not fixed but is generally 2–3 years.
 The Vice Principal is the head of academic affairs. There are around 50 teaching staff along with 35 subordinates. There is a Senior Master whose work is to manage all academic activities and act as a liaison between teachers and Headmaster.
 The Adm. officer is chief of all activities except academics. He is responsible for the infrastructure development of the school.

Activities

Sporting activities
There are sports grounds inside the school campus. There are five football fields, eight basketball courts, six volleyball courts, two lawn tennis courts, two cricket grounds, four handball grounds; besides these there is an eight-lane 400-meter track for athletics which includes venues for other track and field events like high jump, triple jump, long jump, disc throw, shot put throw, javelin throw, and pole-vault. The annual sports meet is held in December in which the best house for athletics meet is judged on the basis of all track and field events. School also is equipped with the best-designed swimming pool.

In each session, activities are organised. Each sport has a championship and the winner is called the champion of that sport. A trophy is given to each champion at the Annual Prize Distribution ceremony being held before winter break.

Academic events
Events like debate, extempore, recitation, general knowledge quiz, and essay writing are organised in three languages - English, Hindi, Assamese at each three levels - senior, junior, sub-junior.

Other events

 Cross Country Running
 Obstacles competition
 Drills competition
 Mass PT competition

National Cadet Corps

Sainik School Goalpara has a wing of the NCC. The 27th Company of the NCC is located inside the school premises to train the cadets. Each Friday afternoon there are NCC classes for 90 minutes. The school participates in the Republic Day Parade, New Delhi. The cadets receive an NCC 'A' certificate after class X and NCC 'B'certificate after class XII.

Admissions

Boys are admitted to class VI and IX, between the ages of 10–11 years for class VI and 13–14 years for class IX as of 2 July of the year of admission. Admission is through the all India Entrance Examination which is held in the third week of January. This is followed by an interview and medical examination in April/May.

Boys selected are called for admission in June.

References

External links
 School website
 OBASSG Website

"Sainik School Goalpara is at "

Sainik schools
Schools in Assam
Goalpara district
Educational institutions established in 1964
1964 establishments in Assam